Li Shijun (29 March 1923 – 10 November 2012), also known by his Esperanto pseudonym Laŭlum, was a Chinese author, editor and translator who elected as a committee member of Akademio de Esperanto since 1983 and reelected in 1992, 2001 and 2010. He was a member of the China Democratic League.

He was among the first few in China who translated the Chinese literature into Esperanto.

Life
Li was born into a family of farming background in the village of Shatou, Anguo in Hebei province, on March 29, 1923.

At the age of 11, Li went to study in Ji'nan No.1 High School, he lived in Ji'nan with his elder brother.

During the Second Sino-Japanese War, he studied in National Sichuan No.6 High School, at the school, he got in touch with Esperanto.

Li started to learn Esperanto in 1939.

In 1946, Li founded the Chengdu Esperanto Association with his teacher Xu Shouzhen and he served as secretary, then he founded a newspaper Jurnalisto.

From 1946 to 1950, Li worked in Chengdu, Renshou, Jianwei, Ziyang, Yibin, and Huayang.

In 1948, his teacher Xu Shouzhen was killed by the Nanking National Government.

After the founding of the Communist State, Li went to Beijing, helping organize the China Esperanto Association.

In October 1950, he was appointed an editor and translator in   Publishing Company.

In 1983, Li was elected the president of Akademio de Esperanto.

In 1984, Li served as a member of the International Esperanto Association.

From 1957 to 1995, Li was a guest professor at Renmin University of China, Beijing Foreign Studies University, Shanghai International Studies University, Qingdao University, and Communication University of China.

Li was honored with the Grabowshi Prize in the 88th World Congress of Esperanto in 2003.

On December 10, 2010, he was honored the Chinese Translation Culture Lifetime Achievement Award, one of the most prestigious translation prizes in China.

Works (translated and/or edited)
 Selections of Chinese Classical Novels
 Selections of Chinese Literature
 Selections of Lu Xun (Lu Xun)
 Midnight (Mao Dun)
 Wang Gui and Li Xiangxiang (Li Ji)
 Cold Night (Ba Jin)
 The Family (Ba Jin)
 Autumn in Spring (Ba Jin)
 Poetry of Li Bai (Li Bai)
 Poetry of Du Fu (Du Fu)
 Selections of Tang Poetry
 Water Margin (Shi Nai'an)
 Romance of the Three Kingdoms (Luo Guanzhong)
 Journey to the West (Wu Cheng'en)

 Strange Stories from a Chinese Studio (Pu Songling)

Awards
 Grabowshi Prize (2003)
 Chinese Translation Culture Lifetime Achievement Award (2010)

References

1923 births
2012 deaths
Writers from Baoding
People's Republic of China translators
20th-century Chinese translators
21st-century Chinese translators
Chinese Esperantists